Sulev Iva (born 3 October 1969 in Võru), also known under the Võro-styled pen name of Jüvä Sullõv, is a Võro identity advocate, and a founding fellow at the Võro Institute.  He has authored numerous subjects on Võro-related topics, and coauthored an ABC book and a reader of the Võro language for elementary school children.

Works 
 Iva, Sulev (2007): Võru kirjakeele sõnamuutmissüsteem (Inflectional Morphology in the Võro Literary Language). Dissertationes Philologiae Estonicae Universitatis Tartuensis 20, Tartu: Tartu Ülikooli Kirjastus
 Jüvä, Sullõv (2002): Võro-eesti synaraamat (Võro-Estonian dictionary). Publications of Võro Institute 12. Tarto-Võro.

Sources 
 Central Library of Võru County
 Võro Institute

References

1969 births
Living people
Estonian non-fiction writers
People from Võru